Vignole Borbera (Genoese: Vigneue) is a comune (municipality) in the Province of Alessandria in the Italian region of Piedmont, located about  southeast of Turin and about  southeast of Alessandria.

The municipality of Vignole Borbera contains the frazioni (subdivisions, mainly villages and hamlets) Variano Inferiore, Variano Superiore and Precipiano.

Vignole Borbera borders the following municipalities: Arquata Scrivia, Borghetto di Borbera, Grondona, Serravalle Scrivia, and Stazzano.

References

External links
 Official website

Cities and towns in Piedmont